Rock Bottom may refer to:

Music
 Rock Bottom Entertainment, an American record label
 Rock Bottom (album), by Robert Wyatt, 1974

Songs
 "Rock Bottom" (Hailee Steinfeld song), 2016
 "Rock Bottom" (Lynsey de Paul and Mike Moran song), 1977
 "Rock Bottom" (Wynonna Judd song), 1994
 "Rock Bottom", by Amy Macdonald from This Is the Life
 "Rock Bottom", by Babyface from For the Cool in You
 "Rock Bottom", by Benny Carter from Further Definitions
 "Rock Bottom", by the Dandy Warhols from The Dandy Warhols Are Sound
 "Rock Bottom", by Eminem from The Slim Shady LP
 "Rock Bottom", by Five Finger Death Punch from And Justice for None
 "Rock Bottom", by Jimmy Needham from Clear the Stage
 "Rock Bottom", by Joe Lynn Turner from Under Cover 2
 "Rock Bottom", by K-Solo from Time's Up
 "Rock Bottom", by Kenny Chesney from The Big Revival
 "Rock Bottom", by Kiss from Dressed to Kill
 "Rock Bottom", by Little Walter, B-side to "Key to the Highway"
 "Rock Bottom", by Midnight Choir from Midnight Choir
 "Rock Bottom", by Modern Baseball from You're Gonna Miss It All
 "Rock Bottom", by Neck Deep from Life's Not out to Get You
 "Rock Bottom", by Pitbull from El Mariel
 "Rock Bottom", by Sebastian Bach from Bach 2: Basics
 "Rock Bottom", by T-Pain from Revolver
 "Rock Bottom", by Tesla from Real to Reel
 "Rock Bottom", by UFO from Phenomenon

Television
"Rock Bottom?", an episode of Code Lyoko
"Rock Bottom" (Runaways), an episode
"Rock Bottom" (SpongeBob SquarePants), an episode
"Rock Bottom" (Transformers: Prime), an episode
Rock Bottom, a cartoon character on the 1960s television cartoon series Felix the Cat
 Rock Bottom, a fictional television show in the Simpsons episode "Homer Badman"

Other uses
Rock Bottom: In Your House, a 1998 professional wrestling pay-per-view event
"Rock Bottom" or Side Slam, the finishing move, for which the PPV event was named, of Dwayne "The Rock" Johnson
Rock Bottom Restaurants Inc., a subsidiary of CraftWorks Holdings, an American restaurant company

ja:ロック・ボトム
sv:Rock Bottom